Alain Therrien  (born July 6, 1966) is a Canadian politician who was elected to represent the riding of La Prairie in the 2019 federal election as a member of the Bloc Québécois. Prior to entering federal politics, he served as a member of the National Assembly of Quebec for the riding of Sanguinet from 2012 to 2018 as a member of the Parti Québécois.

On June 17, 2020, Therrien was called a "racist" by New Democratic Party leader Jagmeet Singh after Therrien said no to a proposed motion to address systemic racism and discrimination in the RCMP; his position was the same as his party, which was to wait for the RCMP to conduct its own evaluation that is currently happening. Singh was subsequently removed from the House of Commons after refusing to apologize.

Electoral record

Federal

Provincial

|}2014 results reference:

|}2012 results reference:

References

External links
 

1966 births
Living people
Parti Québécois MNAs
21st-century Canadian politicians
Bloc Québécois MPs
Members of the House of Commons of Canada from Quebec
People from Saint-Constant, Quebec
People from Verdun, Quebec
Politicians from Montreal